Luciano Orquera (born 12 October 1981 in Córdoba) is an Argentine-Italian rugby union player. He plays as a fly-half for Zebre, an Italian club in the Pro14.

Rugby Union career

Amateur career

Born in Argentina of Italian descent, he first played at Club Palermo Bajo, in Córdoba. He moved to Mirano Rugby 1957 in 2002–03. He was assigned to Petrarca Padova Rugby in 2003–04, where he would stay the next two seasons.

In 2016 he signed for the French amateur club Stade Niçois who play in Fédérale 2.

Professional career

Orquera then moved to France, playing the 2005–06 season at Auch and the next five seasons at Brive. He returned to Italy for the 2011–12 season, signing with Aironi.

International career

After becoming a naturalized Italian citizen, he was first called into the Italy squad that beat Canada by 51-6 at L'Aquila, on 6 November 2004. The next year he made his debut in the 2005 Six Nations Championship, playing five matches and scoring one try and one penalty. He would be absent from the National Team from 2005 to 2008, when he was finally called up once again. He played twice in the 2009 Six Nations Championship. He returned once more to the Italy squad for the friendly with Argentina, as they lost 16-22, in Verona on 13 November 2010. He also played in the 2011 Six Nations Championship.

Orquera had his World Cup debut in the 2011 Rugby World Cup, playing in three games and scoring a try.

Orquera has 44 caps for Italy, with 3 tries, 18 conversions, 29 penalties and 2 drop goals scored, 144 points in aggregate.

He has also played regularly for Italy A, including being their captain.

Orquera started for Italy's opening RBS Six Nations 2013 match against France scoring ten points in an outstanding performance to give Italy a shock win by 23-18. After, he was awarded Man of the Match.

References

External links

1981 births
Living people
Aironi players
Argentine rugby union players
CA Brive players
Italian rugby union players
Rugby union fly-halves
Zebre Parma players
Italy international rugby union players
Sportspeople from Córdoba, Argentina
Expatriate rugby union players in France
Stade Niçois players